Godzilla: The Series is an animated television series developed by Jeff Kline and Richard Raynis, which originally aired on Fox Kids in the United States between September 1998 and April 2000, and a sequel to Godzilla (1998). Malcolm Danare, Frank Welker, Kevin Dunn and Michael Lerner reprise their roles from the film.

Plot
The series follows the Humanitarian Environmental (or Ecological, in "Area 51") Analysis Team (or HEAT for short), a research team led by Dr. Nick Tatopoulos (voiced by Ian Ziering) as they battle giant mutant monsters that frequently appear in the wake of the events depicted in the 1998 film Godzilla. Dr. Tatopoulos accidentally discovers an egg that survived the aerial bombardment before it hatches, in a minor change from the ending in the 1998 film. The creature hatches after Nick Tatopoulos stumbles onto it and it assumes him to be its parent. Subsequently, Dr. Tatopoulos and his associates form a research team, investigating strange occurrences and defending mankind from dangerous mutations.

Godzilla, the only hatchling of its species to survive in the movie, imprints on Nick and becomes the main weapon summoned against the other mutations encountered by the human characters.

The series also introduces two new characters: Monique Dupre, a French secret agent assigned by Philippe Roache to keep an eye on Godzilla and H.E.A.T., and Randy Hernandez, an intern of Nick's who specializes in computer hacking.

Characters

H.E.A.T.

 Godzilla – A giant mutated iguana kaiju and the only surviving offspring of the first Godzilla that attacked New York City in 1998. Due to Nick's presence at his hatching, Godzilla has imprinted on Nick as his parent and as a result, he is very protective of him. Nick also has the ability to control Godzilla to a certain extent, which allows humans to use him as a weapon against other giant and mutated monsters. He always seems able to sense whenever Nick is in trouble and is quite willing to follow him and the rest of H.E.A.T. all over the world. Unlike his biological parent, he seems to be incapable of asexual reproduction but is capable of using the signature atomic breath.
 Dr. Niko "Nick" Tatopoulos (voiced by Ian Ziering) – Leader of H.E.A.T. and the "adoptive father" of Godzilla. Nick fiercely protects Godzilla and other mutations from both foreign and domestic governments. He is portrayed as younger and with longer hair than Matthew Broderick's character from the 1998 film as well as beingless absent-minded.
 Dr. Elsie Chapman (voiced by Charity James) – One of the original members of Nick's team; a sarcastic, dry-witted, feisty, altruistic palaeo-biologist. She specializes in studying the behavior of Godzilla and other mutations. She also gets jealous when it comes to Audrey around Nick. James takes over the role from film actress Vicki Lewis.
 Dr. Mendel Craven (voiced by Malcolm Danare) – The team's engineer and chemist. He is slightly cowardly (as his last name implies) and prone to numerous strong allergies, but is often resourceful. He is also enamored of Elsie. Although initially fearful of Godzilla, over the course of the series he comes to trust the monster as an ally. Danare reprises his role from the film.
 Randy Hernandez (voiced by Rino Romano) – An intern and expert hacker working under Nick, and like him, is Godzilla's defender. He calls Godzilla "the G-man" and sometimes "the big guy" and he has referred to him as "Mr. G" and "the Lizard King" each on one occasion. Hugely talented in all fields of technology, but extremely lazy and somewhat laconic. Randy has a crush on Monique but is always rebutted when he attempts to court her. The acronym H.E.A.T. originated with Randy, although he initially wanted it to stand for High-performance Environmental Attack Team.
 Monique Dupre (voiced by Brigitte Bako) – A French Agent of the DGSE specializing in hand-to-hand combat and infiltration. She is originally sent to have Godzilla killed but becomes a member of H.E.A.T. after being assigned to supervise Godzilla indefinitely. She generally seems cold and impassive, but proves capable of honour, courage, compassion and loyalty. She is very talented with martial arts, espionage, and marksmanship.
 N.I.G.E.L. (voiced by Tom Kenny) – Short for "Next Millennium Intelligence Gathering Electronic Liaison", N.I.G.E.L. is an analysis robot created by Mendel and reprogrammed by Randy to have various quirky voices from a Texas cowboy to a Shakespearean actor. A running gag on the show is that he is damaged or destroyed in every episode (except one, and that one only because he does not appear in it) presumably to be rebuilt or replaced later (evidenced by Craven's remark in the episode "End of the Line" that he should "just buy spare parts in bulk") in a concept that is similar to Kenny McCormick from South Park.

Supporting
 Major Anthony Hicks (voiced by Kevin Dunn) – Commanding officer of the Sandy Point Military Base in New York, who played a key role in the first Godzilla's death. Though he is at first skeptical of the second Godzilla, over time he develops a soft spot for the creature, whom he views as a hero. Dunn reprises his role from the film.
 Audrey Timmonds (voiced by Paget Brewster) – Nick's college sweetheart and somewhat untrustworthy girlfriend, whose career as a reporter often leads the two into conflict. Yet despite that, she's always been there for Nick whenever it involves Godzilla's life. Brewster takes over the role from film actress Maria Pitillo.
 Victor "Animal" Palotti (voiced by Joe Pantoliano) – A Channel 8 News cameraman and Audrey's sarcastic working partner who is always willing to help her film Godzilla and the other mutations, alongside helping the H.E.A.T. team. He is also a happily married man. Pantoliano takes over the role from film actor Hank Azaria.
 Mayor Ebert (voiced by Michael Lerner) – The cynical mayor of New York City who is determined to keep it safe from mutation-related threats. Lerner reprises his role from the film.
 Philippe Roache (voiced by Keith Szarabajka) – High ranking agent in the French DGSE. Roache led the team hunting down the first Godzilla and later sent Monique to kill the second, but relented when the creature saved lives. Szarabajka takes over the role from film actor Jean Reno.

Villains
 Cameron Winter (voiced by David Newsom) – A former classmate of Nick in college. He is a devious technological mogul whose desire is to control Godzilla for the furtherance of his ulterior goals. Smug and sadistic, Winter frequently taunts Nick and H.E.A.T. and often enacts various plans to keep Godzilla in line. He also knows how to cover up his acts and maintain his position, allowing him to avoid prosecution. At the end of the series, he is still at large.
 Dale, Bill, and Hank (voiced by Ronny Cox, Tom Kenny, and Bob Joles) – Three game hunters who came to New York to hunt Godzilla. Dale is the leader of the group, Hank is the middleman, and Bill is the idiot of the group. The three of them would usually try to hunt Godzilla which usually ends with them either being thwarted by H.E.A.T. or ending up in legal trouble. The hunters worked for Winter at one time using his mecha creations to hunt Godzilla for a while. Their names are a parody of the characters from King of the Hill.
 The Leviathan Aliens (voiced by Ron Perlman) – An ancient species of psychically powerful extraterrestrials. One of their spaceships, called the Leviathan, crashed on Earth sometime during the Cretaceous Period of the Mesozoic Era and remained hidden until modern times. They attempted to conquer Earth by using a tachyon transmitter to send mind-controlling signals to subdue the mutations in order for their alien race to invade the planet  - including Godzilla and their cyborg mutation, Cyber-Godzilla (created from the carcass of the first Godzilla) - but were ultimately defeated by H.E.A.T and a freed Godzilla and forced to retreat, probably for good.
 Sidney Walker (voiced by Steve Susskind) - An everyday guy who was undergoing Theta wave therapy to cure his insomnia, but ended up in a coma-like state that eventually manifested as the giant monster Crackler. After Crackler's destruction upon Sidney rambling about every negative thing that was said to him throughout his life, he will be in therapy.
 Dr. Jonathan Insley (voiced by Nick Jameson) - Dr. Jonathan Insley is the main antagonist that appears in the episode "Future Shock." He is the creator of the D.R.A.G.M.A.s. Dr. Insley is incarcerated offscreen.
 Alexandra Springer (voiced by Linda Blair) - Alexandra Springer is the main antagonist in the episode "S.C.A.L.E.". She is the leader of S.C.A.L.E. (Servants of Creatures Arriving Late to Earth), a radical group that believe that mutations are the next stage of evolution and must be protected. She and S.C.A.L.E. interfere when Godzilla and H.E.A.T. were stopping Skeetra but were then arrested. She gave Audrey a S.C.A.L.E. pin for spreading their message, she was bailed and then followed the Heat Seeker to Monster Island as the pin turned out to be a tracking device. She and her forces released the mutations, then locked up H.E.A.T. along with Animal and Major Hicks, and had Audrey continued filming so the world would know of their actions. Luckily, H.E.A.T. managed to escape, captured Springer's forces, and placed the mutations back in their habitats. Springer attempted to activate the island's self-destruct, but was then arrested by the military. In custody, she gave Audrey a tape and asked her to tell her story to the world. However, Audrey decided not to air it and threw the tape into the fire.
 Milo Sanders (voiced by Stuart Pankin) - An obnoxious tour guide of "Monster Liner", he bothers Nick and H.E.A.T. and ends up putting his passengers in danger while Godzilla was fighting the Deep Dweller. He also invited some photographers who attempted to get pictures of Godzilla up close, but were attacked by the Deep Dweller and had to be saved by H.E.A.T. While on board the Heat Seeker, Milo sneaks down below and finds a tape that reveals the location of Godzilla's lair. Seeing this as his one chance of fame, he plans to reveal to everyone where Godzilla is. Audrey and Animal tried to stop him, but he escapes with the tape by stealing the H.E.A.T. Chopper. However, his attempt to reveal the location of Godzilla is cut short, when a news broadcast shows the police recovering the H.E.A.T. Chopper. Knowing that he's in trouble, he tries to flee but is then arrested by the police, ruining his chance of fame.
 Dr. Alexander Preloran (voiced by Kenneth Mars) - A brilliant xenobiologist who Craven idolizes. Preloran and his colleagues enter a sunken Leviathan ship, where Preloran decides to help them conquer Earth, believing it will help the planet. He ultimately sacrifices himself by launching an escape pod manually so H.E.A.T. and his colleagues can escape, though Preloran soon discovers a doorway flooded with light and enters it, leaving his fate ambiguous.
 Tobias Wilson (voiced by Dorian Harewood) - A ringmaster of the mutant circus "Mutant Mania", he put a bounty on Godzilla, but Nick and H.E.A.T. saved Godzilla from the bounty hunters. Later, Nick confronts him for his bounty on Godzilla, telling Wilson to leave Godzilla alone or he'd do everything in his power to shut down Mutant Mania. When Medusa, a mutated Sea anemone escapes and starts wreaking havoc in New York, he tries to stop Mayor Ebert from destroying Medusa, claiming "she's private property". However, the mayor holds him responsible for the incident. After Godzilla defeats Medusa and places her in an oil container, Wilson attempts to flee with her only to be stopped by the military as Wilson is arrested by Major Hicks.
 Colonel Charles Tarrington (voiced by Michael Chiklis) - A soldier who is heading a project overseeing the creation of mutant scorpions for weapons. After the first scorpion proves uncontrollable, he has a group of smaller, more controllable scorpions created. Tarrington appears to see the error of his ways after Godzilla destroys the scorpions, but orders a new batch of scorpions created immediately after. His final fate is unknown.
 Paul Dimanche (voiced by Jesse Corti) - A corrupt politician who is overfishing a Louisiana bayou and leaving the locals hungry. He shows no care for the safety of his guests when the Swamp Beast attacks his boat and mansion. After he was saved by Georges, he confesses his crimes and was unknowingly filmed by Animal.
 Dr. Hugh Trevor (voiced by Roddy McDowall) - A scientist who is studying Nessie the Loch Ness Monster, but wants to destroy it for attacking his lab. It is later revealed he kidnapped Nessie's baby and plans to sell it on the Black Market. However, Godzilla and Nessie stop him and save the baby, after which Nessie tossed his sub back into the water. It is unknown what happened to him after Godzilla helped Nessie save her baby. As he is never seen again, he is assumed deceased.
 Maximillian Speil (voiced by Clancy Brown) - Wealthy fight promoter who sets up a monster fighting tournament on a private island for wealthy attendees. He was arrested offscreen.

Kaiju

Episodes

Series overview

Season 1 (1998–99)

Season 2 (1999–2000)

Home media
Columbia TriStar Home Video released two separate episode collections on VHS: Trouble Hatches, composed of the two-part pilot episode (which was actually titled "New Family" when it first aired), and Monster War, featuring the three-part episode of the same name. In 2006, Sony released nine episodes on DVD, spread out onto three separate volumes: The Monster Wars Trilogy, consisting of the same three-part episode previously released on the VHS version, Monster Mayhem, which included "What Dreams May Come", "Bird of Paradise", and "Deadloch", and Mutant Madness, which contained "S.C.A.L.E.", "The Twister" and "Where Is Thy Sting?".

In 2006, Sony released the "Monster Edition" DVD of Godzilla (1998), featuring three episodes of the TV series: "What Dreams May Come", "Monster War: Part 1" and "Where Is Thy Sting?". In 2014, Mill Creek Entertainment released the complete series on DVD in North America, including the two unaired episodes. The episodes were released in chronological order, not the broadcast order.

Reception
The series did well during Fox Kids' Saturday morning line-up. Ultimately, however, it was overshadowed by the late 1990s Pokémon/Digimon war between Kids' WB and Fox Kids during the 1999–2000 at the time. As a result, Godzilla: The Series was placed in different timeslots on Saturdays to accommodate many of the Digimon marathons and back-to-back episodes (this would affect other Fox Kids shows as well). For a brief period of time, episodes of Godzilla: The Series were either never repeated, or skipped over and rescheduled. There was a brief period where the show was taken off the schedule to accommodate new shows for midseason, resulting in two episodes that were never broadcast in the U.S.

The series was more positively received by critics and fans than the film on which it was based, being considered more faithful to the original Godzilla.

Video games
Two video games were released for the Game Boy Color. They were developed by Crawfish Interactive and published by Crave Entertainment. Godzilla: The Series was released in 1999 and Godzilla: The Series - Monster Wars was released in 2000.

References

External links
 Godzilla: The Series at the official Godzilla website by Toho Co., Ltd.

1998 American television series debuts
2000 American television series endings
1990s American animated television series
2000s American animated television series
1998 Japanese television series debuts
2000 Japanese television series endings
1990s Japanese television series
2000s Japanese television series
Fox Broadcasting Company original programming
Anime-influenced Western animated television series
Godzilla television series
Kaiju
Television series by Sony Pictures Television
Works by Len Wein
Animated television series about reptiles and amphibians
American sequel television series
American children's animated action television series
American children's animated adventure television series
American children's animated drama television series
American children's animated science fantasy television series
Japanese children's animated action television series
Japanese children's animated adventure television series
Japanese children's animated science fantasy television series
Television shows based on films directed by Roland Emmerich
Television series by Adelaide Productions
Television shows set in New York City
Animated television shows based on films
Television series about mutants